Atahensic is an Iroquois sky goddess.  Atahensic is associated with marriage, childbirth, and feminine affairs in general.

According to legend, at the time of creation, a tree broke and left a hole in the ground that  led to the centre of the Earth.  Atahensic fell from the sky, and before falling into the hole left by the tree, she was carried down on the wings of birds. After her fall, the birds brought her down the hole onto water.  A giant turtle then emerged from the underground waters and carried her to the surface. She then gave birth to Earth Mother, who in turn gave birth to Hahgwehdiyu and Hahgwehdaetgah, twin sons. Hahgwehdaetgah, the evil twin, killed Earth Mother by bursting out of her side during birth. Hahgwehdiyu, the good twin, then planted a seed into his mother's corpse. From this seed grew maize, as a gift to mankind.

References

Childhood goddesses
Goddesses of the indigenous peoples of North America
Iroquois mythology
Marriage goddesses
Sky and weather goddesses